Uzbekistan Boxing Federation is the governing body of amateur Olympic-style boxing in Uzbekistan. It was founded on March 23, 1920. The Federation was re-founded in 1992 after dissolution of the USSR. The headquarters is located in Tashkent. Uzbekistan Boxing Federation is a member federation of National Olympic Committee of the Republic of Uzbekistan. It is a member of the International Boxing Association (AIBA) and the Asian Boxing Council (ASBC).

History 
The history of the development of boxing in Uzbekistan is inextricably linked with the name of Sidney Lvovich Jackson, Honored Coach of the USSR. He was one of America's most popular flyweight boxers. The First World War found Sydney Jackson in St. Petersburg, where he spent his tour. Travel to the US was temporarily banned. Unable to return home through the US Embassy in Russia, Jackson went to Tashkent with letters of recommendation. Here the October Revolution found him, he decided to stay in Tashkent. During the Civil War, Sydney Jackson was a member of the International Brigade, a fearless fighter for the cause of the people. After the end of the civil war, Jaxson returned to Tashkent and was appointed as an instructor in the General Education in sports. Since that time, the history of the development of boxing in Uzbekistan begins The Boxing Federation was organized in 1928.

In Uzbekistan, in 1990, boxing is cultivated in 4 DSOs (PR, "D", "TR", SA) there are 35 boxing departments, including DSYUSH-82, SDUSHOR-3, as well as 4 departments of SHISP in the cities of Andijan - 1, Samarkand - 2, Tashkent - 1. Currently the chairman of the Boxing Federation of Uzbekistan is Ramatov Achilbai Zhumaniyazovich.

The Federation's Chairman is Ochilboy Ramatov; the Vice President is Saken Pulatov; the Secretary General is Shohid Tillaboev.

Affiliation 

 International Boxing Association
 Asian Boxing Confederation
 National Olympic Committee of the Republic of Uzbekistan

References

External links 

Sports governing bodies in Uzbekistan
National members of the Asian Boxing Confederation